The Dignitatis Humanae Institute (DHI; also known as the Institute for Human Dignity) is a Catholic-inspired institute based in Collepardo, Italy. Its stated mission is to "protect and promote human dignity based on the anthropological truth that man is born in the image and likeness of God."

History 

The institute was founded by British citizen Benjamin Harnwell while working as an aide to Conservative Party MEP Nirj Deva, who would also become involved with the group. According to Harnwell, the motivation behind the establishment of the DHI came about when Italian politician Rocco Buttiglione was vetoed for the position of the European Commission's vice-president and Commissioner for Justice, Freedom, and Security. Buttiglione, who was nominated to the European Commission by then-Italian prime minister Silvio Berlusconi, had described homosexuality as a sin and said the principal role of women was to have children.

The institute operated from Rome between 2011 and 2019. In 2019, the DHI moved from Rome to the Abbey of Trisulti, a former monastery in Collepardo, Frosinone. From July 2010 to January 2019, Cardinal Renato Raffaele Martino, former President of the Pontifical Council for Justice and Peace, held the position of Honorary President. In 2019, Cardinal Martino resigned over objections to the institute's plans for using the Trisulti monastery for political purposes and was succeeded by Cardinal Raymond Leo Burke, who had been on the DHI Board of Advisors since 2013. Burke is known as a sharp critic of Pope Francis, criticizing him for being too lenient towards homosexuality and abortion.

DHI founder Benjamin Harnwell was the first Chairman of the institute. In 2011, he was succeeded by British royal family member Lord Nicholas Windsor, which in turn would be succeeded in 2013 by  politician Luca Volontè.

The group has ties to some of the most conservative factions inside the Catholic Church. In 2014, the Institute invited Steve Bannon as one of its key note speakers at a conference to discuss poverty, during which he praised European far-right parties. In 2019, Reuters reported that Bannon had helped the institute to craft curricula. Cardinal Raymond Burke, president of the institute's board of advisers, said that Bannon would play a leading role in the institute, helping in "the defense of what used to be called Christendom". Bannon said that he hoped to spur a populist movement in Europe.

A plan was backed by Bannon to turn the Abbey of Trisulti into an academy for training future European nationalists and populist politicians. The rights to use the facility were revoked by the Italian government at the end of May 2019 as bills were not paid. On 26 May 2020, an Italian regional court ruled in favor of the institute's plan. On 15 March 2021, the Council of State ruled that the Culture Ministry was correct in cancelling the concession it had given to the institute.

In a letter tweeted by Cardinal Burke's Twitter account on 25 June 2019, he announced his "termination of any relationship with the Dignitas Humanae Institute" over irreconciliable differences with Bannon, particularly regarding Bannon's apparent interest in a film adaptation of Frédéric Martel's book In the Closet of the Vatican and his calling into question clerical celibacy.

References

External links 
 
 Universal Declaration of Human Dignity
 H.E. Cardinal Raymond Leo Burke's Keynote Address at 2013 International Conference on Human Dignity

Religious organisations based in Italy
Political organisations based in Italy
Right-wing politics in Italy
Catholic organizations